Amsterdam is an unincorporated community in Licking County, in the U.S. state of Ohio.

History
Amsterdam had its start when the National Road was extended to that point. The town was laid out in 1830. An old variant name of the community was Melgen. A post office called Melgen was established in 1888, and remained in operation until 1901.

References

Unincorporated communities in Licking County, Ohio
1830 establishments in Ohio
Populated places established in 1830
Unincorporated communities in Ohio